Spain competed at the 2016 Winter Youth Olympics in Lillehammer, Norway from 12 to 21 February 2016.

Alpine skiing

Boys

Girls

Bobsleigh

Cross-country skiing

Boys

Girls

Snowboarding

Snowboard cross

Snowboard and ski cross relay

Qualification legend: FA – Qualify to medal round; FB – Qualify to consolation round

See also
Spain at the 2016 Summer Olympics

References

2016 in Spanish sport
Nations at the 2016 Winter Youth Olympics
Spain at the Youth Olympics